The korfball competition at the 2022 World Games took place in July 2022, in Birmingham in United States, at the Birmingham Jefferson Convention Complex. Originally scheduled to take place in July 2021, the Games were rescheduled for July 2022 as a result of the 2020 Summer Olympics postponement due to the COVID-19 pandemic.

Qualification
A total of 8 teams will compete in the korfball event at the 2022 World Games.

The 2019 IKF World Korfball Championship (IKF WKC) acted as the qualification tournament. Eight best teams qualified for the World Games, because top 8 consisted of participants of at least four different continents.

Qualified teams

Preliminary round

Group A

Group B

Knockout stage

5–8th place semifinals

Semifinals

Fifth place game

Third place game

Final

Final ranking

Medalists

References

External links
 What's korfball? And why is it gaining popularity in Birmingham, Alabama?
 The World Games 2022
 International Korfball Federation

 
2022 World Games
2022 in korfball